The Coryneliales are an order of ascomycetous fungi within the monotypic subclass Coryneliomycetidae in the class Eurotiomycetes and within the subdivision Pezizomycotina. Species in this order are found almost exclusively in the tropics, primarily as a pathogen on the gymnosperm Podocarpus, although it has been found on other plants like the Southern Hemisphere beech Nothofagus, and Drimys.

Taxonomy
The order was circumscribed by Fred Jay Seaver and Carlos E. Chardón in 1924. The taxonomy as of 2022 recognizes 2 families, 10 genera and 83 species:
Family Coryneliaceae 
Caliciopsis  – 36 species
Corynelia  – 16 species
Coryneliopsis  – 2 species
Coryneliospora  – 2 species
Fitzpatrickella  – 1 species
Lagenulopsis  – 1 species
Pewenomyces  – 1 species
Tripospora  – 5 species

Family Eremascaceae 
Dactylodendron  – 3 species
Eremascus  – 2 species

References

Eurotiomycetes
Ascomycota orders